Selattyn and Gobowen is a civil parish in Shropshire, England.  It contains 31 listed buildings that are recorded in the National Heritage List for England.  Of these, one is listed at Grade I, the highest of the three grades, one is at Grade II*, the middle grade, and the others are at Grade II, the lowest grade.  The parish contains the villages of Gobowen and Selattyn, and smaller settlements, and is otherwise rural.  Most of the listed buildings are houses, cottages, farmhouses, and farm buildings, the earliest of which are timber framed or have timber-framed cores.  In the parish are two country houses and a church, which are all listed, together with structures associated with them.  The other listed buildings include a disused limekiln, two milestones, a lock-keeper's cottage, a railway station and an associated cottage, and a war memorial.


Key

Buildings

References

Citations

Sources

Lists of buildings and structures in Shropshire